Mendoncia velloziana is a plant native to Atlantic Coast restingas vegetation which is an ecosystem of Atlantic Forest biome. In addition, this plant grows  either in Cerrado vegetation of Brazil. This plant grows in following states of Brazil: Bahia, Ceará Minas Gerais Rio de Janeiro, São Paulo, Paraná and Santa Catarina, and it is usually visited by the hummingbirds.

References
Mendoncia velloziana is cited in the following research articles:

 ABREU, C. R. M.; VIEIRA, M. F.. (2004) Hummingbirds and their floral resources in a forest fragment in Viçosa, southeastern Brazil with have the abstract in English.
   BRAZ, D. M; CARVALHO-OKANO, R. M.; KAMEYAMA, C. (2002) Acanthaceae of Mata do Paraíso Forest Reserve, Viçosa, Minas Gerais with have the abstract in English.

External links
    Mendoncia velloziana
   Mendoncia velloziana

velloziana
Endemic flora of Brazil
Flora of the Atlantic Forest
Flora of the Cerrado